Lasconotus is a genus of cylindrical bark beetles in the family Zopheridae. There are at least 20 described species in Lasconotus.

Species
These 21 species belong to the genus Lasconotus:

References

Further reading

 
 
 
 
 

Zopheridae
Articles created by Qbugbot